The 10th United States Colored Heavy Artillery Regiment was an artillery regiment in the Union Army during the American Civil War that served in the New Orleans defenses. The unit was organized in New Orleans in November 1862 as the 1st Louisiana Heavy Artillery Regiment (African Descent), and redesignated as the 1st Corps d'Afrique Heavy Artillery Regiment a year later. It briefly became the 7th United States Colored Heavy Artillery Regiment in April 1864, then assumed its final designation in May.

Corps d'Afrique
The designation was changed to 1st Corps d'Afrique Heavy Artillery in November 1863.

United States Colored Troops
The unit was designated the 7th Regiment Heavy Artillery on April 4, 1864, and 10th Regiment Heavy Artillery May 21, 1864. Members mustered out on February 22, 1867.

See also
1st Louisiana Battery Light Artillery (African Descent)
List of Louisiana Union Civil War units
List of United States Colored Troops Civil War units

References

External links
1905 Shannon genealogy: genealogical record and memorials of one branch of the ... Biography of 2nd Lt James Griswald Shannon 10th USCT Heavy Artillery; postwar Harvard Medical School Class of 1870 pp.291-292

Military units and formations established in 1862
Heavy Artillery, 001
H 010
Artillery units and formations of the American Civil War
1862 establishments in Louisiana
Military units and formations disestablished in 1867